Sang Nisht (also Romanized as Sang Nīsht) is a village in Kaseliyan Rural District, in the Central District of Savadkuh County, Mazandaran Province, Iran. At the 2006 census, its population was 512, in 125 families.

References 

Populated places in Savadkuh County